Mission Creek is a water body west of Topeka, Kansas, United States. The  tributary of the Kansas River goes through Wabaunsee County (where it begins) and Shawnee County, Kansas (passing to the west of Topeka in its run to the Kansas). Mission Creek was named for a Kaw mission near the banks.

See also
Dover, Kansas
List of rivers of Kansas

References

External links

Rivers of Kansas
Tributaries of the Kansas River
Rivers of Shawnee County, Kansas
Rivers of Wabaunsee County, Kansas